The 1984 Macau Grand Prix Formula Three was the 31st Macau Grand Prix race to be held on the streets of Macau on 18 November 1984. It was the first edition for Formula Three cars.

Entry list

Race results

Qualifying

Race

References

F2 Register

External links
 The official website of the Macau Grand Prix

Macau Grand Prix
Grand
Macau